Domenico Carretti (c. 1650-c. 1719) was an Italian painter, born in Bologna, and active mainly at Brescia. He painted a Virgin with the Infant Jesus and St. Theresa for the church of San Pietro in Oliveto in Brescia.

References

17th-century Italian painters
Italian male painters
18th-century Italian painters
Painters from Bologna
Painters from Brescia
Year of death unknown
Year of birth unknown
Year of birth uncertain
18th-century Italian male artists